Paul Christensen (born April 15, 1996) is an American former professional soccer player who played as a goalkeeper.

Career

College
Christensen played four years of college soccer at the University of Portland, where he made 72 appearances for the Pilots and kept 20 shutouts. Paul battled now Rs. senior GK and close friend Kienan Weekes in the goal while at Portland for 4 years. The Wall as some know him, otherwise known as El Jefe, was the turning point behind an impressive turnaround for the program.

While at college, Chirstensen also played with Premier Development League side Seattle Sounders FC U-23.

Professional career
On January 21, 2018, Christensen was selected 70th overall in 2018 MLS SuperDraft by Atlanta United FC. He signed with their United Soccer League affiliate side Atlanta United 2 on February 18, 2018. He made his professional debut on March 31, 2018 in a 2–2 draw against the Charlotte Independence.

On May 4, 2018, Christensen signed a short-term deal to be included on the roster for Atlanta United's senior team after backup goalkeepers Alec Kann and Mitch Hildebrandt were injured. He made his debut on May 9 against Sporting Kansas City, replacing Brad Guzan after he was sent off with a red card.

Christensen announced his retirement on November 17, 2022.

References

External links
 

1996 births
Living people
American soccer players
Association football goalkeepers
Atlanta United FC draft picks
Atlanta United FC players
Atlanta United 2 players
Greenville Triumph SC players
Major League Soccer players
People from Woodinville, Washington
Portland Pilots men's soccer players
Seattle Sounders FC U-23 players
Soccer players from Washington (state)
USL League Two players
USL Championship players